Sir Shettima Kashim Ibrahim,  (10 June 1910 – 25 July 1990) was a Nigerian politician who was head of the Native Administration in Borno State and was a minister for Social Services in the 1950s. He held the traditional title of the Waziri of the Emirate of Borno after two previous Waziris had been forced to resign as a result of scandals in the Borno local administration.

He was a close associate of Sir Ahmadu Bello.

Life

Ibrahim was born in Gargar Ward, Yerwa to the family of Ibrahim Lakanmi.  He started his education learning Arabic and Quran before attending Borno Provincial School in 1922. In 1925, he was admitted into the Katsina Training College and finished his studies with a teacher's certificate in 1929. He started working as a teacher in 1929 at the Borno Middle School and by 1933, he had become a Provincial Visiting Teacher. He was later promoted to a Senior Visiting Teacher and education officer for the province of Borno. He was conferred with the title of Shettima of Borno in 1935 and for a while he was known as Shettima Kashim. He joined politics in 1951-52, when he was elected into the Northern Regional Assembly, he was nominated from the North as a cabinet nominee. Thereafter, he was appointed the Federal minister for Social Services and later that of Education.

In 1956, he was appointed as the Waziri of Borno by the Shehu. 
Waziri Ibrahim became the Governor of the Northern region in 1962, holding office until the military coup of 16 January 1966 that brought Major General Johnson Aguiyi-Ironsi to power.  He was appointed a CBE in 1960 and knighted as a KCMG in 1962.

References

People from Borno State
1910 births
1990 deaths
20th-century Nigerian politicians
Commanders of the Order of the British Empire
Knights Commander of the Order of St Michael and St George
Kanuri people
Nigerian recipients of British titles
Nigerian knights
People from Maiduguri